St. Joseph Township is one of the twelve townships of Williams County, Ohio, United States.  The 2000 census found 3,227 people in the township, 1,821 of whom lived in the unincorporated portions of the township.

Geography
Located in the southwestern corner of the county along the Indiana state line, St. Joseph Township borders the following townships:
Florence Township - north
Superior Township - northeast corner
Center Township - east
Farmer Township, Defiance County - southeast corner
Milford Township, Defiance County - south
Stafford Township, DeKalb County, Indiana - southwest
Troy Township, DeKalb County, Indiana - west

The village of Edgerton is located in the southern part of the township. The St. Joseph River flows north to south through it.

Name and history
It is the only St. Joseph Township statewide.

Government
The township is governed by a three-member board of trustees, who are elected in November of odd-numbered years to a four-year term beginning on the following January 1. Two are elected in the year after the presidential election and one is elected in the year before it. There is also an elected township fiscal officer, who serves a four-year term beginning on April 1 of the year after the election, which is held in November of the year before the presidential election. Vacancies in the fiscal officership or on the board of trustees are filled by the remaining trustees.

References

External links
County website

Townships in Williams County, Ohio
Townships in Ohio